The Turbinenhalle is a music and cultural venue on Mülheimerstraße in Oberhausen, North Rhine-Westphalia, Germany.

The complex opened in 1909 to generate power to the Gutehoffnungshütte coal and steel engineering company which was based in Oberhausen until 1986.

After a number of years derelict, the building was reopened as a disco in 1993 and has since evolved into one of the largest venues in the surrounding area. The complex consists of numerous rooms of varying sizes. The largest room is Turbinenhalle 1 with a capacity of approximately 1,500 - followed by Turbinenhalle 2 which fits approximately 1,100. There are also three nightclubs on site - T-Club, Steffy and COSMO.

The Turbinenhalle is situated on the Duisburg–Dortmund railway and is a stop on the Ruhrpott Industrial Heritage Trail.

Events and Acts
Several international and domestic acts have performed at the Turbinenhalle including:

The Turbinenhalle is also a regular venue for Gelsenkirchen-based professional wrestling promotion Westside Xtreme Wrestling.

References

Music venues in Germany
Oberhausen
Buildings and structures in Oberhausen